Michael Simmons (born 1983) is an American politician serving as a Democratic member of the Illinois Senate from the 7th district. He was appointed to the office in February 2021 to replace retiring Senator Heather Steans.

Early life and education 
Simmons was born in Chicago and raised in the Lincoln Square neighborhood. He earned a Bachelor of Arts degree in political science from Amherst College.

Career 
As an undergraduate student, Simmons worked as an intern in the United States Senate office of Barack Obama. From 2007 to 2009, he worked as a staff assistant and legislative correspondent in the office of Senator Dick Durbin. From 2009 to 2011, he was the policy director for Cook County Commissioner Bridget Gainer. He served as policy director for Chicago Mayor Rahm Emanuel from 2011 to 2013 and as deputy commissioner of the Chicago Department of Planning and Development from 2013 to 2016. Since September 2017, Simmons has operated Blue Sky Strategies, a public policy and consulting firm. In June 2020, Simmons became deputy director of My Brother's Keeper Alliance, an initiative managed by the Obama Foundation.

On February 6, 2021, Simmons was appointed to the Illinois Senate, succeeding Heather Steans. The appointment was made by elected committeepeople of the Cook County Democratic Party representing the wards and townships covered by the 7th district. State Representative Kelly Cassidy was reported as the frontrunner for the appointment soon after Steans announced her retirement. However, Simmons secured the position after earning the support of 48th ward alderman Harry Osterman (who held the largest weighted share of the votes in the appointment process) and three other committeepeople. He is the first openly gay member of the Illinois State Senate.

As of July 2022, Senator Simmons is a member of the following Illinois Senate committees:

 Appropriations - Health Committee (SAPP-SAHA)
 Behavioral and Mental Health Committee (SBMH)
 Healthcare Access and Availability Committee (SHAA)
 Redistricting - Chicago North Committee (SRED-SRCN)
 Tourism and Hospitality Committee (STOU)
 Transportation Committee (STRN)

References 

Democratic Party Illinois state senators
Politicians from Chicago
1983 births
Living people
Amherst College alumni
21st-century American politicians
African-American people in Illinois politics
LGBT state legislators in Illinois
Gay politicians
LGBT African Americans
21st-century African-American politicians
20th-century African-American people